Nemanja Rnić (born 30 September 1984) is a Serbian former professional footballer who played as a defender.

Club career
In June 2003, Rnić signed his first professional contract with Partizan on a five-year deal. He won two national championship titles and one national cup, before moving abroad to Belgian club Anderlecht on a free transfer in June 2008. Over the following three seasons, Rnić made less than 30 competitive appearances for the Brussels-based club, before being loaned to fellow Pro League side Germinal Beerschot in January 2011.

In July 2011, Rnić returned to Partizan and signed a one-year contract. He made 25 league appearances in the 2011–12 season, helping the club win its fifth consecutive title. After more than six months without a club, Rnić signed a contract with Ukrainian side Hoverla Uzhhorod in March 2013. He subsequently moved to Austria and joined Wolfsberger AC in August 2013. Over the next six years, Rnić made over 150 league appearances and scored three goals.

International career
Rnić represented Serbia and Montenegro at the 2006 UEFA Under-21 Championship in Portugal. He also represented Serbia at the 2007 UEFA Under-21 Championship in the Netherlands, as the team finished as runners-up.

On 8 June 2005, Rnić made his senior debut for Serbia and Montenegro in a friendly against Italy at the Rogers Centre in Toronto, as the game ended 1–1. He also made two appearances for Serbia in 2008, both under the managerial reign of Miroslav Đukić.

Statistics

Club

International

Honours

Club
Partizan
 Serbian SuperLiga: 2004–05, 2007–08, 2011–12
 Serbian Cup: 2007–08
Anderlecht
 Belgian Pro League: 2009–10
 Belgian Super Cup: 2010

International
Serbia
 UEFA Under-21 Championship: Runner-up 2007

Notes

References

External links

 
 
 
 

Association football defenders
Austrian Football Bundesliga players
Beerschot A.C. players
Belgian Pro League players
Expatriate footballers in Austria
Expatriate footballers in Belgium
Expatriate footballers in Ukraine
FC Hoverla Uzhhorod players
First League of Serbia and Montenegro players
FK Partizan players
FK Teleoptik players
R.S.C. Anderlecht players
Serbia and Montenegro footballers
Serbia and Montenegro international footballers
Serbia and Montenegro under-21 international footballers
Serbia international footballers
Serbia under-21 international footballers
Serbian expatriate footballers
Serbian expatriate sportspeople in Austria
Serbian expatriate sportspeople in Belgium
Serbian expatriate sportspeople in Ukraine
Serbian footballers
Serbian SuperLiga players
Footballers from Belgrade
Ukrainian Premier League players
Wolfsberger AC players
1984 births
Living people